Warm Leatherette is the fourth studio album by Grace Jones, released on 9 May 1980 by Island Records. The album features contributions from the reggae production duo Sly and Robbie and is a departure from Jones's earlier disco sound, moving towards a new wave-reggae direction.

Background and production
Although having established herself as a performer with a string of club hits in the US and a large gay following, Jones had only achieved very modest commercial success with her first three disco albums. For Warm Leatherette, Jones went through a musical and visual reinvention. The singer teamed up with producers Chris Blackwell and Alex Sadkin, and Sly and Robbie, Wally Badarou, Barry Reynolds, Mikey Chung and Uziah "Sticky" Thompson, aka the Compass Point Allstars, for a record that would be a total departure from disco and an exploration of new wave music, blending reggae and rock. Warm Leatherette was the first of three albums recorded at the Compass Point Studios in the Bahamas. According to John Doran of BBC Music, Warm Leatherette is a "post-punk pop" album that, "delved into the worlds of disco, reggae and funk much more successfully than most of her 'alternative' contemporaries, while still retaining a blank-eyed alienation that was more reminiscent of David Bowie or Ian Curtis than most of her peers." David Bowie influences were also noted by Joe Muggs of Fact.

The album includes covers of songs by The Normal, The Pretenders, Roxy Music, Smokey Robinson, Tom Petty and the Heartbreakers and Jacques Higelin. Blackwell intended to make a record with "a harsh sound that was heavy with Jamaican rhythm". For Jones's version of "Breakdown", Tom Petty specially wrote a third verse for the song. The album also includes one song co-written by Jones, "A Rolling Stone", and one French track, "Pars" (French for "Leave"), a reggae re-imagining of Jacques Higelin's song. "Bullshit" is an original by Barry Reynolds. Reynolds would later write or co-write several tracks for Jones: "Art Groupie", "I've Seen That Face Before (Libertango)", the entire B-side of the Living My Life album, and "Well Well Well". "Pull Up to the Bumper" was also recorded during the sessions for Warm Leatherette, but its R&B sound was found not fitting in the rest of the material and so it appeared on Jones's next album, Nightclubbing in 1981.

The vinyl LP release of the album included shorter versions of some of the songs, due to limited capacity of the vinyl format. Most compact disc editions included extended 12" mixes of selected tracks that had originally appeared on the single-sided chrome audio cassette.

Artwork
Warm Leatherette was the first Jones album with cover art designed by her then-boyfriend, Jean-Paul Goude, which presented the singer's androgynous look for the first time. It featured a black and white photograph of Jones pregnant, with her signature flattop haircut, sitting with her arms crossed. Chris Blackwell praised it as "a very powerful image".

After the commercial success of Nightclubbing, Island Records re-released the Warm Leatherette album with new artwork, replacing Jean-Paul Goude's original cover with a picture of Jones performing "Walking in the Rain", taken from her 1982 concert video A One Man Show. The image featured on the back cover was a snapshot of Jones singing "Warm Leatherette", also from A One Man Show. Some subsequent CD releases would adopt the new artwork with the original studio portrait included in the inner sleeve.

Singles
Three singles received a wider, international release: "Love Is the Drug", "Private Life" and "The Hunter Gets Captured by the Game". Notable is that the first two were not released in North America, although they are considered two of Jones's signature songs.

"A Rolling Stone" was released as the lead single in the UK, but did not garner much attention. "Love Is the Drug" quickly followed, but did not make any chart impact - until six years later, when a remixed version became a minor hit in the UK, peaking at No. 35. The most successful single off the album, and Grace Jones's breakthrough song, was "Private Life", which entered the top 20 of singles chart in the UK, becoming her first chart entry in that country, and has since become one of her signature songs. "The Hunter Gets Captured by the Game" was released as the fourth single.

For the North American market "The Hunter Gets Captured by the Game" was chosen as the first single. It failed to enter mainstream charts, but made it to the R&B chart in the US. "Warm Leatherette" reached the top 20 on the dance chart, on the strength of being the lead track on a 12" album promo sampler. "Breakdown" was released as a single only in the US. "Pars", sung in French, was a single in Canada and France.

Reception

AllMusic critic Ron Wynn wrote that "the overall album had more energy and production gloss than previous LPs that had been aimed completely at the club market." Music critic Robert Christgau thought that "with Smokey Robinson and Chrissie Hynde scripting adventures in dominance and fellow Jamaicans Shakespeare and Dunbar adding cyborgian oomph, the theoretical allure of her persona is finally made flesh."

Warm Leatherette charted only in Australia, the UK and the US. Although it remains one of the least successful Grace Jones albums in terms of sales and chart performance, it holds the credit for being her breakthrough record in the UK. It is also one of the highest-rated of all her studio releases.

Track listing

Personnel
 Grace Jones – vocals, background vocals
 Barry Reynolds – guitar
 Mikey Chung – guitar
 Wally Badarou – keyboards
 Robbie Shakespeare – bass guitar
 Sly Dunbar – drums
 Uziah Thompson – percussion
Technical
 Chris Blackwell – production, engineering, mixing
 Alex Sadkin – production, engineering, mixing
 Ted Jensen – mastering engineer
 Kendal Stubbs – assistant engineering
 Jean-Paul Goude – artwork

Charts

Release history

References

External links
 Warm Leatherette on AllMusic
 Warm Leatherette on Discogs
 Warm Leatherette on Rate Your Music

1980 albums
Albums produced by Alex Sadkin
Albums produced by Chris Blackwell
Grace Jones albums
Island Records albums
Post-punk albums